{{Infobox person
| image              = 
| alt                = 
| caption            = 
| birth_name         = 
| birth_date         = 
| birth_place        = Pune, Maharashtra, India
| death_date         = 
| death_place        = 
| nationality        = 
| other_names        = 
| occupation         = Actor 
| years_active       = 2012 - Present
| notable_works      = Honar Sun Me Hya GharchiSukhachya Sarini He Man BawarePahile Na Mi Tula| spouse             = 
| children          = 1
| signature          = Shashank Ketkar Signature.jpg
}}

Shashank Ketkar (born 15 September 1985) is a Marathi television and theater actor predominantly working in the Marathi. He is best known for his role as Shree on the daily soap Honar Sun Me Hya Gharchi.

 Personal life 
Shashank Ketkar was married to actress Tejashree Pradhan in 2014, but they divorced in 2016. Shashank married again in 2017 to Priyanka Dhavale who is a lawyer by profession and hails from Dombivli, a city near Mumbai.

 Career 
Ketkar earned a Masters of Engineering Management in Sydney, Australia. He worked as a duty manager at Olympic gold-medalist Ian Thorpe's swimming school in Australia. While in Sydney, he took part in Marathi plays and musical programs organized by cultural groups. Upon completing his education and on returning to India, he decided to indulge in performing arts, which had been only his hobby up till then. He joined "Sudarshan Rangamanch", a theatre group in Pune where he landed his first role in the play Purnaviram, which was directed by Pramod Kale and written by Sachin Kundalkar. He then auditioned for Marathi television shows and debuted as Kailash on ETV Marathi's daily soap Kalay Tasmay Namah, where he played grandson of Vikram Gokhale. He also did a negative character of Aniket Gaydhani in the serial Swapnanchya Palikadle that aired on Star Pravah.

Ketkar's biggest break came in 2013 with the Zee Marathi's daily soap Honar Sun Me Hya Gharchi where his lead role as Shreerang 'Shree' Gokhale made him popular. In 2013, at the Zee Marathi Awards, Ketkar received the "Best Actor" and "Best Couple" award. In 2015, the show's lead characters Shree and Janhavi started trending on social networks and WhatsApp as Janhavi's famous dialogue in the show "Kahihi ha Shree!", which she regularly repeats, became popular.

In 2014, he played the role of Mangesh Kadam and Leena Bhagwat's son in the play Goshta Tashi Gamtichi, for which he won the Best Supporting Actor (Commercial Plays) at the 2015 Akhil Bhartiya Natya Parishad Awards. In 2015, his first single "Yaara" was released by Sagarika Musics. The romantic-single is co-sung by Deepika Jog and the video also features Ketkar.

 Filmography 
 Films 

Television

Music album

Plays
 Purnaviram Goshta Tashi Gamtichi Kusum Manohar Lele''

Media image

Awards

References

External links
 

Marathi actors
Indian male soap opera actors
Living people
Male actors in Marathi theatre
1985 births
Male actors in Marathi television